Clinton Kane is an  Australian singer-songwriter, signed to Columbia Records. His 2021 singles "Chicken Tendies" and "I Guess I'm in Love" reached numbers 88 and 90, respectively, on the US Billboard Hot 100, with the latter song also peaking at number 25 in Australia and number 22 in the UK. Kane currently resides in Las Vegas.

Early life
Clinton Kane was born on 26 November 1998 to a Filipino father and Norwegian mother. Due to his mother's occupation as a Pentecostal pastor, he has lived in Greece, Brunei, England and Las Vegas.

Kane is a self-taught singer and multi-instrumentalist, and grew up singing in church. He qualified to study medicine in 'A' Level College, but pursued a path that blended music and travel. Kane quelled growing anxiety and stress into song and in 2016, began uploading covers and subsequently original songs onto his YouTube channel.

Career
Kane was signed to Columbia Records in 2019, with the label declaring the artist a "huge talent" with "powerful vocals". Kane relocated to Los Angeles and released the 5-track EP This Is What It Feels Like.

In December 2019, Kane released "So I Don't Let Me Down". Upon its release, Kane said that song is about having to accept the fact that life is constantly changing – for better or worse.

In 2020, Kane provided vocals for Dutch DJ Martin Garrix's single "Drown".

On 19 February 2021, Kane released "Chicken Tendies", which peaked at number 83 on the UK Singles Chart and 88 on the US Billboard Hot 100 chart. Kane told Billboard that the song is "about accepting things and relationships I can't change".

On 20 August 2021, Kane released "I Guess I'm in Love", which peaked at number 22 on the UK Singles Chart and 90 on the US Billboard Hot 100 chart.

On 22 July 2022, Kane released his debut studio album, Maybe Someday It'll All Be OK.

Discography

Albums

Extended plays

Singles

As lead artist

As featured artist

Notes

Other charted songs

Awards and nominations

ARIA Music Awards
The ARIA Music Awards is an annual awards ceremony that recognises excellence, innovation, and achievement across all genres of the music of Australia. 

! 
|-
| 2022
| "I Guess I'm in Love"
| ARIA Award for Song of the Year
| 
| 
|-

References

External links
 
 

Australian people of Filipino descent
Australian people of Norwegian descent
Australian pop singers
British emigrants to Australia
Columbia Records artists
Living people
1999 births